Peregrine of Opole ( 1260 – ?) was a Silesian Dominican friar. He was twice elected a provincial of his Order and became designated an inquisitor of Wrocław by the pope John XXII.

His major literary achievement is his twofold collection of Latin sermons: Sermones de tempore (sermons on the feasts of the liturgical year) and  Sermones de sanctis (sermons on feasts of particular saints).

References

Further reading
Peregrini de Opole sermones de tempore et de sanctis. Warsaw, 1997. (Introductory notes in German, Latin and Polish.)
Brückner, Aleksander. Literature religijna w Polsce średniowiecznej 1: Kazania i piesni. Warszawa, 1902. 
Hervé, Martin. Pérégrin de Opole (vers 1260-vers 1330): Un prédicateur dominicain à l'apogée de la chrétienté medieval. Rennes, 2008. 
Scheneyer, Johannes Baptist. Repertorium der lateinischen Sermones des Mittelalters IV. (1969), 557–74.
Tatrzyński, Richard. "Peregrini de Opole Sermones Editoris Nota". Studia "Przeglądu Tomistycznego" 1 (1997). 
 Wünsch, Thomas. "Zur Gestaltung von Predigtexempla aus den "Sermones de tempore" des Peregrinus von Oppeln." In Die Anfänge des Schrifttums in Oberschlesien bis zum Frühhumanismus, edited by Gerhard Kosellek, 139–67. Frankfurt/Main, 1997.

1260s births
Year of death unknown
Polish Dominicans
Sermon writers